The Selma Cloverleafs were a baseball team based in Selma, Alabama.

The original Cloverleafs played in the Southeastern League and Alabama–Florida League at various times between 1928 and 1962.

Independent League
In 2002 a new version of the team was charter members of the Southeastern League of Professional Baseball. They played their home games in Selma, Alabama, at Bloch Park. The team left Selma after playing only three games in 2003 and playing the remainder of that season as the Southeastern Cloverleafs before folding at season's end.

2002
In April 2002, it was announced that Selma was the recipient of a team in the newly formed Southeastern League of Professional Baseball. For their inaugural season Merritt Bowden served as the manager. On May 27, 2002, the Cloverleafs played the Montgomery Wings in an exhibition game, marking the first professional baseball game to be played within the city since the original Cloverleafs folded in 1962. The season would officially begin on May 31, 2002, against the Americus Arrows on opening night, with Selma mayor James Perkins, Jr. throwing out the opening pitch. Dennis Gomez was the starting pitcher for the 'Leafs. Throwing 6 innings with 8 K's and giving up 1 earned run, picking up the win and closer Tony Macon pitched the top of the ninth inning to earn the save. Both feats were firsts for the Cloverleafs since the 1960s..The opening series drew over 2,000 fans to the stadium before the teams would embark on an 18-game roadtrip.

On June 25, 2002, the team returned after the extended roadtrip to play in front of many Cloverleaf alumni from the 1950s–1960s teams that called Selma home. The major highlight of the second half of the season occurred on July 17 when both Desmond O'Quine and Jose Colon each hit a grand slam in the seventh inning of a 17–2 rout of the rival Montgomery Wings.

The season would end after a 3–0 loss to the Pensacola Pelicans in the league tournament on August 29. The 2002 squad finished with an overall record of 29-29.

2002 Roster
 Kevin Bice, catcher
 Jose Colon, outfield
 Joe Colvin, outfield
 Bart Cowan, outfield
 Jessie Ellison, pitcher
 Dennis Gomez, pitcher
 Luke Hurst, catcher
 Lee Jolly, pitcher
 Brock Lowell, outfield, 1st base, catcher
 Tony Macon, pitcher
 Lucus McCollum, pitcher
 Desmond O'Quinn, 3rd base
 Kyle Parker, pitcher
 John Renfro, pitcher
 Brian Rushton, pitcher, 1st base
 Keith Sills, 2nd base
 Andrew Tarver, short stop
 David Thomas, 1st base
 Terrance Thomas, outfield
 Eric Turnrose, pitcher
 Terry Waters, pitcher
 Joe Whitmer, 1st base, outfield
 John Learson, pitcher
 Carlos Booker, coach
 Merritt Bowden, player/manager
 Jim Brantley, player/coach

2003
After seeing success in the 2002 season along with the teams’ new ownership, the outlook for 2003 looked bright. The team had initial player tryouts in March followed by an invitation only try-outs in April to fill out the final team roster.

On May 13, it was announced that the team would play as a traveling team for the 2003 season after ownership was unable to pay the league a $100,000 safety net to make sure they would finish out the season on the heels of the Ozark and Americus teams folding mid-season in 2002. After the announcement, the team would play on May 29 and a final double-header on May 31 in Selma before officially becoming a traveling team. These games against the Montgomery Wings were played in Selma due to a scheduling conflict at Paterson Field.

Of note, the traveling Cloverleafs team made national press upon signing the late Ted Williams' son, John Henry Williams, on June 9. His first game came against the Pensacola Pelicans on June 12. John played in 13 games with the Cloverleafs with an average of .051.

The 2003 squad finished with an overall record of 23–44, and finished sixth in the overall standings.

2003 Roster

 Brian Baker
 Jack Blanchard
 Jim Booth
 Vince Cerni
 Mike Clohessy
 Bobby Cobo
 Matt Day
 Eric Donaldson
 Sean Easton
 Michael Falco
 Anthony Gonzales
 Duffer Harrison
 Hector Henriquez
 Brad Hertel
 Steve Horn
 Patrick Jernigan
 Jeff Larue
 Brock Lowell
 Tyler Marsh
 Eric McKay
 Mike Mulhall
 Nate Nelson
 Brett Nuss
 James Pack
 Ryan Price
 Martin Reilly
 Augie Rodriguez
 Mike Settle
 Josey Shannon
 Chad Simmons
 Travis Suereth
 Antoine Watts
 Josh Wilke
 John Williams
 Jason Wilso

References
Baseball Reference
 Masterson, John. (May 29, 2002) "Gates will open early for Leaf's opener." The Selma Times-Journal.
 Veach, Katherine. (June 4, 2002) "Nearly 2,000 attend homestand." The Selma Times-Journal.
 AP Reports. (July 18, 2002) "Selma team hits pair of slams in inning." The Associated Press State & Local Wire.
 Gullion, John. (May 14, 2003) "Cloverleafs Gone." The Selma Times-Journal.
 Ted Williams' son signed by pro league from the Sporting News, extracted 19 October 2006.
 2003 Selma Cloverleafs Statistics from The Baseball Cube, extracted 19 October 2006.

Professional baseball teams in Alabama
Defunct Southeastern League teams
Defunct Alabama-Florida League teams
Defunct Georgia-Alabama League teams
Defunct Cotton States League teams
Defunct Southern Association teams
Selma, Alabama
Baseball teams established in 1901
Baseball teams disestablished in 2003
Boston Red Sox minor league affiliates
Washington Senators minor league affiliates
Chicago Cubs minor league affiliates
Pittsburgh Pirates minor league affiliates
Philadelphia Phillies minor league affiliates
Kansas City Athletics minor league affiliates
Cleveland Guardians minor league affiliates
1928 establishments in Alabama
Defunct independent baseball league teams
Southeastern League teams
Defunct baseball teams in Alabama